The Argyle Ministry was the 48th ministry of the Government of Victoria. It was led by the Premier of Victoria, Stanley Argyle, and consisted of members of the United Australia Party. The ministry was sworn in on 19 May 1932.

References 

Cabinets established in 1932
Victoria (Australia) ministries
1932 establishments in Australia
Ministries of George V